Sidr or SIDR may refer to:

 Cyclone Sidr, a very severe cyclonic storm in the Bay of Bengal in 2007.
 As Sidr, Saudi Arabia
 Sidra, Libya
 Sidrat al-Muntaha, a tree mention in the Quran.
 Sidre, a self-help group for Bedouin in Israel
 Ziziphus lotus, a bush.
 Ziziphus zizyphus (Jujube), a tree.
 "Secure Inter-Domain Routing" (in computer networking)